Shellen Lubin (born April 4, 1953) is an American director, writer, performer, and teacher of theatre and music.  She is best known for her philosophical musings about art and artists, found in her Monday Morning Quotes and articles in Backstage.

Early life
Shellen Lubin was born and raised in Valley Stream, New York, United States, by parents Samuel and Lora Lubin (née Bondrov), with her older sister Allene. She graduated from Bennington College in 1974 with a triple major in Drama, Music and Dance.  During her time at Bennington, she appeared in Miloš Forman's first film in America, 'Taking Off', which featured two songs she wrote ("It's Sunday", which she performed, and "Feeling Sort Of Nice", performed by Karen Klugman).  After graduating, she moved to New York City to continue pursuing her career in music and theatre.

Songwriting and theatre
Her first major theater project after college was the musical Molly's Daughters, which she wrote for the American Jewish Theater in 1978.  It was produced twice, first at the Henry St. Settlement featuring Lisa Loomer and Jane Ives, then at the 92nd Street Y featuring Rosalind Harris and directed by Pamela Berlin.  Afterwards, she spent a long time writing various plays and songs, most notably Imperfect Flowers for Gretchen Cryer and James “Jimmy” Wlcek, and a number of songs with musician and composer Bill Dixon.  In 1983, WBAI-FM presented a one-hour special of her songs entitled Shellen Lubin, Songwriter/Singer.  She also wrote and performed a one-woman musical about the experience of having her first child (entitled 'Mother/Child') at numerous cabaret spaces and theatres from 1986–88, including the Susan Bloch Theater and Interart Theatre.

In 1989, she began her professional theater directing career at the Producer's Club Theatre with LIARS, written by Elliot Meyers and starring James “Jimmy” Wlcek, Peter Sprague, Annie Hughes, and Joyce West.  She followed LIARS with the critically acclaimed Larry Myers’ Gene Tierney Moved Next Door in 1994 at Theater for the New City, with Cynthia Enfield, Rik Walter and Tom Fenaughty.  She worked with Larry Myers again two years later, directing Coffee With Kurt Cobain, starring Angelica Page Torn again at Theater for the New City.  In 1996, she also directed an evening of one-act plays by Suzanne Bradbeer, Kaadi Taylor, and Andria Laurie at the Mint Theater for the Six Figures Theatre Company. Norman Siopis’ one man show, REAL, followed at the Trilogy Theater in 1998.

She has spent the last few years working on My Brave Face, a ‘rocabaret’ which she co-created with Robert John Cook, starring Robert John Cook, Cynthia Enfield and Matthew Gandolfo.  It spent the two years since its inception on the cabaret circuit to critical and audience acclaim, while going through rewrites, and is currently in the recording studio.

Other works

Monday Morning Quotes

In 1998, Shellen Lubin began writing a weekly mailer called Monday Morning Quotes.  They are quotes from other sources, followed by a brief observation about them, what they describe or how they relate to each other.  Initially it was only sent to a small group of her friends, but eventually her subscribers grew through word of mouth.  Since interest grew, she archived many of them on her website, and continues adding new subscribers each week. Quotes about morning to her credit have also been covered on other related quotes site.

Backstage articles
Based on her years of work in theater and her growing Monday Morning Quotes mailing list, the theater publication, Backstage, commissioned Shellen Lubin to write seven cover pieces about the experience of living as an artist and working in the business of the Arts.  She is the only person ever to have written for Back Stage from a philosophical perspective.

References

1953 births
Living people
People from Valley Stream, New York
20th-century American dramatists and playwrights
American women dramatists and playwrights
20th-century American women writers
21st-century American dramatists and playwrights
21st-century American women writers
Writers from New York (state)
Bennington College alumni